Borbo holtzii, the variable swift, is a butterfly of the family Hesperiidae. It is found in Africa, including south-eastern Senegal, Guinea, Sierra Leone, Liberia, Ivory Coast, Ghana, Nigeria,  Gabon, the Republic of the Congo, Angola, Kenya, Tanzania, Malawi, Zambia, Zimbabwe, Mozambique, South Africa (the Limpopo Province, Mpumalanga and KwaZulu-Natal) and Eswatini. The habitat consists of frost-free savanna.

Adults are on wing year round, but are most common in winter.

The larvae feed on Rottboellia megaphylla.

References

Butterflies described in 1883
Hesperiinae
Butterflies of Africa